Éanna Murphy may refer to:
 Éanna Murphy (Offaly hurler) (born 1990)
 Éanna Murphy (Galway hurler) (born 1998)